Crunk / Krunk is a style of hip hop music originating in the southern United States.

Crunk may also refer to:
 Crunk, Southern US hip hop slang for "cranked up", thus the name of the music genre
 Crunk, a portmanteau of "crazy drunk", deriving from the alcoholic drink
Crunk Energy Drink, a brand of non-alcoholic energy drink, and Crunk Juice, a later version of the drink with alcohol, based on the "crunk juice" cocktail suggested by the Lil Jon album of the same name
"Crunk", being under the influence of both cannabis and alcohol
 "The Crunk", a character in the 1943 film Mr. Lucky
 Cookin' Crunk: Eating Vegan in the Dirty South, a cookbook by Bianca Phillips

Music 

 Crunk&B, a hybrid music genre
 Crunk rock, a hybrid music genre
 Crunk Juice, an album by Lil Jon & the East Side Boyz
 "Crunk Muzik", a song by rapper Jim Jones
 Gangsta Crunk, an album by rapper Daz Dillinger

See also
 Krunk (disambiguation)
 Kronk (disambiguation)